Ronald L. Kuby  (born July 31, 1956) is an American criminal defense and civil rights lawyer, radio talk show host and television commentator. He has also hosted radio programs on WABC Radio in New York City and Air America radio.

Kuby currently leads the Law Office of Ronald L. Kuby in Manhattan.

Early life and education
Kuby was born in Cleveland, Ohio, the son of Ruth Miller, a secretary, and Donald Kuby, a salesman. His mother was from a Jewish family and his father, who died in 1990, was a Franciscan friar who converted to Judaism and became a militant Zionist before becoming Christian again. His parents divorced when he was five years old, after which Kuby lived with his mother. At 13, he joined the Jewish Defense League under the influence of his father, who was a follower of Meir David Kahane. As a teenager he emigrated to Israel, but returned to the U.S. after being disillusioned by what he describes as "anti-Arab racism."

He returned to Cleveland and lived in a commune for the next several years. In 1973, he briefly attended an accredited alternative high school.  After graduating, he attended Cleveland State University for one year.

Kuby dropped out of college in 1974 and moved to St. Croix, in the U.S. Virgin Islands, where he worked on a tugboat and developed an interest in West Indian ethnobotany and medicinal plants. He moved briefly to Maine, then to Kansas in 1975, where he completed his degrees in cultural anthropology and history at the University of Kansas. Kuby was a free-speech and anti-apartheid activist while at KU, where he graduated with highest distinction, had a 4.0 average, and conducted and published original fieldwork, including the 1979 "Folk medicine on St. Croix: an ethnobotanical study", after returning to St. Croix several times. Kuby alleged the University of Kansas police intentionally broke his arm when they responded to an anti-apartheid protest during a commencement ceremony. Protesters were urging the KU Endowment Association to divest itself of investments in companies doing business in South Africa.

Kuby earned his Juris Doctor from Cornell Law School in 1983. Kuby claims his grades entitled him to a position on the prestigious Cornell Law Review, but he declined the invitation.  He also claims to have graduated as one of the top students in his class.

Personal life
On January 23, 2006,  Kuby married Marilyn Vasta on the 20th anniversary of their first date.

Partnership with William Kunstler
While in college, Kuby interned with William Kunstler, a senior lawyer with 20 years' experience, notable for many of his sensational cases including the defense of the Chicago Seven. From 1983 until Kunstler's death in 1995, Kuby worked as a partner in Kunstler's law firm, with both men taking up "the fight for the poor, the oppressed and the downtrodden". The two men declared they were not only colleagues, but best friends as well.

Kunstler and Kuby never formalized a partnership with a contract or tax filings. Despite a letterhead that read "Kunstler and Kuby", Kuby was paid as an employee and never shared in the firm's profits and losses. On this basis Kuby was denied ownership rights to the firm's case files, accounts, and name after Kunstler died, and Kunstler's widow, Margaret Ratner, put her late husband's archives under lock and key. Kuby filed a complaint against her with the attorney disciplinary committee; the committee dismissed the complaint in August 1996. In December 1996, a court case brought by Ratner to restrain Kuby from using the name "Kunstler & Kuby" resulted in Kuby's being denied any rights in the Kunstler firm.

Notable cases
{{Reduced pull quote|right|[Kuby] was, nonetheless, every prosecutor's worst nightmare; a defense attorney who could charm and incite a jury, and bully most any witness. Not to mention his gift for making cops look like liars and fools. It was Kuby who had found to keep the courtroom open, a guerilla tactic ...|David Nocienil<ref>David Nocienil, The Brass Wall'", p. 252</ref>}}
With Kunstler
Kuby, with Kunstler, represented Gregory Lee Johnson, a protester who burned a U.S. Flag at the 1984 Republican National Convention.

Sheikh Omar Abdel-Rahman, the blind cleric who headed the Egyptian-based militant group Al-Gama'a al-Islamiyya, accused of planning and encouraging terrorist attacks against Americans.

Colin Ferguson, the man responsible for the 1993 Long Island Rail Road shooting (who chose to represent himself at trial).

Nico Minardos, the Hollywood TV and movie actor, accused in an FBI sting operation of conspiracy to ship arms to Iran.

Qubilah Shabazz, the daughter of Malcolm X, accused of plotting to murder Louis Farrakhan of the Nation of Islam.

Glenn Harris, a New York City public school teacher who absconded with a 15-year-old girl for two months.

Darrell Cabey, a youth who was acquitted of assault on Bernard Goetz and successfully sued Goetz for shooting Cabey.

Yu Kikumura, a member of the Japanese Red Army, and associates of the Gambino Crime Family.

During the Gulf War, the pair represented American soldiers claiming conscientious objector status. They also represented El Sayyid Nosair, assassin of the late Rabbi Meir Kahane, whom Kuby's father had admired, and the leftist radical turned health care activist Dr. Alan Berkman.

After Kunstler's death
After Kunstler's death, Kuby continued the work of his late mentor. In 1996, he won a judgment of $43 million for Darrell Cabey against Bernhard Goetz in connection with the 1984 New York City Subway shooting.  He also won nearly a million dollars for members of the Hells Angels motorcycle club who were wrongfully arrested by the New York City Police Department. He won the 2001 release of two men imprisoned 13 years, for a murder they did not commit, and a judgment of $3.3 million for the pair. He secured a reversal of a murder conviction for a mentally ill homeless man whose candle accidentally caused the death of a firefighter. In 2005, Kuby won close to a million dollars for another wrongfully convicted man who spent eight years in prison.

In 2006, Kuby was subpoenaed by the defense to testify at the second trial of John A. Gotti, the son of Gambino crime family leader John Gotti, which included the charges for the kidnapping and attempted murder of Kuby's then on-air co-host, Curtis Sliwa. Kuby testified that in a 1998 conversation, Gotti said he had wanted to leave organized crime. "He told me he was sick of this life", Kuby told the court. "He wanted to rejoin his family and be done with this." Sliwa reacted angrily to his longtime co-host's testimony for the defense, calling him a "Judas", though Kuby claimed he was following the law by answering a subpoena to testify.

In April 2009, Kuby spoke about the capture of Abduwali Muse, a Somali teenager apprehended during the rescue of Richard Phillips, the Captain of the MV Maersk Alabama, a freighter briefly captured by Somali pirates.  Kuby said he was discussing organizing a team to defend Muse, suggesting he was invalidly captured while immunized by a flag of truce.

In September 2009, Kuby appeared on behalf of Ahmad Wais Afzali, an imam accused of lying to authorities in a terrorism related case.  Afzali had told Najibullah Zazi that authorities were asking questions about him. Kuby mocked the charges against Zazi as internally inconsistent and the very idea that Afzali would deny having a conversation that he knew had been taped. Kuby won Afzali's release on bail and negotiated a plea bargain to a reduced charge of lying to agents, with deportation in lieu of imprisonment.

Kuby defended Raphael Golb, the son of a biblical scholar. Golb had sent emails wherein he impersonated critics of his father's and falsely admitted committing various defamatory acts, including academic fraud; he was arrested in 2009. Charged with multiple felonies and misdemeanors, Golb was convicted at trial and appealed to New York's Supreme Court, which affirmed the charges. Golb then appealed to the New York Court of Appeals, the highest court in New York City.  They dismissed some of Golb's convictions, such as identify theft and aggravated harassment (striking down the latter as unconstitutionally vague and overbroad), but they upheld others, including criminal impersonation and forgery.

Radio and television personality
Kuby has appeared on local television news programs, typically ready to give colorful commentary on behalf of his newsworthy clients.

From 1999 to 2007, Kuby and Curtis Sliwa co-hosted a daily radio show titled Curtis and Kuby in the Morning on WABC-AM 770, in New York City.  After an eight-year run, WABC replaced the show with Don Imus and retained Sliwa. Kuby and Sliwa then shared a short-lived midday television program on MSNBC. Kuby began broadcasting on Air America Radio in 2008, at first as a replacement for Randi Rhodes, then later with a regular show, Doing Time with Ron Kuby. In May 2009 Air America moved Kuby's show to a new time slot, which took him off of the schedule for many affiliates. By June, his show was removed from Air America's schedule.

On January 2, 2014, Curtis and Kuby returned to WABC in the noon-3pm (Eastern) timeslot.  He was released from WABC in late May 2017 for budgetary reasons.

Kuby is also a frequent pundit and substitute anchor on Court TV and has appeared several times on the Discovery Channel program Oddities, offering legal advice.

On May 16, 2008, he was interviewed on the WBGO program "Conversations with Allan Wolper". Kuby discussed how the media sometimes convicts criminal suspects in the court of public opinion

Unlike defense lawyers who usually suppress specifics about their residence, family, and habits, Kuby agreed in 2012 to be featured in the weekly New York Times "Sunday Routine" photo report on prominent or colorful New Yorkers.

Kuby is also featured in the 2019 Crimetown Podcast "The Ballad of Billy Balls" which deals with the murder of William Heitzman at the hands of the NYPD in June 1982. Kuby offers colorful legal commentary.

Pop culture references
 In the film The Big Lebowski'' (1998), Jeff "The Dude" Lebowski (played by Jeff Bridges) demands representation either by Kuby or Bill Kunstler during the Malibu Police Station scene.

References

External links 

Air America Radio show site
Newsmeat, Kuby's Federal Campaign Contribution Report
A free speech warrior
Jonathan Leaf Talks With Ron Kuby
Saddam Hussein's Defense Transcript from the Paula Zahn show of a debate between Ron Kuby and David Horowitz

20th-century American Jews
American talk radio hosts
Cornell Law School alumni
Ohio lawyers
Lawyers from Cleveland
University of Kansas alumni
1956 births
Living people
American civil rights lawyers
Activists from Ohio
21st-century American Jews